Expert Review of Vaccines is a monthly peer-reviewed medical journal covering all aspects impacting the clinical effectiveness of vaccines. According to the Journal Citation Reports, the journal has a 2015 impact factor of 4.222, making it the highest-impact journal dedicated specifically to vaccines.

References

External links 
 

Vaccinology journals
English-language journals
Expert Review journals
Monthly journals
Publications established in 2002